Terry Phelps and Raffaella Reggi were the defending champions but did not compete that year.

Brenda Schultz and Andrea Temesvári won in the final 7–6, 6–4 against Elise Burgin and Rosalyn Fairbank.

Seeds
Champion seeds are indicated in bold text while text in italics indicates the round in which those seeds were eliminated.

 Leila Meskhi /  Larisa Savchenko (quarterfinals)
 Elise Burgin /  Rosalyn Fairbank (final)
 Penny Barg /  Ronni Reis (semifinals)
 Mary Lou Daniels /  Wendy White (quarterfinals)

Draw

External links
 1989 Eckerd Open Doubles Draw

1989 WTA Tour
Eckerd Open
1989 in American tennis